Peter Maitland Evatt (5 January 1922 – 23 December 1972) was an Australian rower. He competed in the men's coxless four event at the 1956 Summer Olympics. He was the national single-sculls rowing champion in 1953, and won a gold medal in the men's coxed four at the 1954 British Empire and Commonwealth Games in Vancouver.

Evatt was the son of Australian politician Herbert Vere Evatt, and his sporting career overlapped with his father's service as Leader of the Opposition. He stood unsuccessfully for the Labor Party in the Division of Bennelong at the 1969 federal election. He also contested Labor preselection for Bennelong in December 1970, but was defeated.

Evatt died at his home in Ryde in December 1972 after being electrocuted while repairing a toaster. His body was not found until two days after he died. At the time of his death, he was working in the legal section of the Department of Housing.

References

1922 births
1972 deaths
Australian male rowers
Olympic rowers of Australia
Rowers at the 1956 Summer Olympics
Rowers from Sydney
Commonwealth Games medallists in rowing
Commonwealth Games gold medallists for Australia
Rowers at the 1954 British Empire and Commonwealth Games
Australian Labor Party politicians
Accidental deaths in New South Wales
Accidental deaths by electrocution
Australian Army personnel of World War II
Australian Army officers
Medallists at the 1954 British Empire and Commonwealth Games
20th-century Australian people